October's Baby is a novel by Glen Cook published in 1980.

Plot summary
October's Baby is the second book in the Dread Empire series.

Reception
Greg Costikyan reviewed October's Baby in Ares Magazine #5 and commented that "Cook's action writing is clean and sparse, but his attempts at character development are somewhat more awkward. The characters do not blend seamlessly into the body of writing, but seem to stand out at odd moments, when the thrust of action comes to a halt."

Reviews
Review by Kathleen Dalton-Woodbury [as by Kathleen D. Woodbury] (1980) in Science Fiction Review, Winter 1980
Review by Roz Kaveney (1981) in Foundation, #21 February 1981

References

1980 novels